Spanish–American War Memorial may refer to:

 California Volunteers (sculpture), also known as the Spanish–American War Memorial, San Francisco, California, U.S.
 Soldiers' and Sailors' Monument (Indianapolis), Indiana, U.S.
 Spanish–American War Memorial (Arlington National Cemetery), Virginia, U.S.
 Spanish–American War Memorial (Columbus, Ohio), U.S.
 Spanish–American War Nurses Memorial, Arlington National Cemetery, Virginia, U.S.
 Spanish–American War Soldier, Milwaukee, Wisconsin, U.S.
 Spanish–American War Soldier's Monument, Portland, Oregon, U.S.
 Spanish–American War Veterans Memorial, Portland, Oregon, U.S.

See also
List of Spanish–American War monuments and memorials